is a concert hall in Sumida, Tokyo, Japan. It opened in 1997 and has two auditoria; the main hall, with 1,801 seats; and the small hall, with 252 seats. It is the home of the New Japan Philharmonic. Nikken Sekkei were the architects, with acoustical design by Nagata Acoustics, who tested their concept with a 1:10 model.

See also
 Kinshichō Station
 Suntory Hall

References

External links
 Homepage 
 New Japan Philharmonic 

Buildings and structures in Sumida, Tokyo
Music venues in Tokyo
Concert halls in Japan
Music venues completed in 1997
1997 establishments in Japan